Greenleaf is a surname, and occasionally also a given name.

People surnamed Greenleaf
 Cat Greenleaf (born 1972), American TV reporter
 Diunna Greenleaf (born 1957), American blues singer and songwriter
 Elizabeth Bristol Greenleaf (1895–1980), American collector of folk songs
 Elizabeth Gooking Greenleaf (1681–1762), American apothecary
 Frank Greenleaf (1877–1953), Canadian sports administrator
 Halbert S. Greenleaf (1827–1906), U.S. Representative; spouse of Jean Brooks Greenleaf
 James Greenleaf (1765–1843), important early American land speculator
 Jean Brooks Greenleaf (1832–1918), American woman suffragist; spouse of Halbert S. Greenleaf
 Ralph Greenleaf (1899–1950), American pocket billiard champion
 Robert K. Greenleaf (1904–1990), founder of the modern Servant leadership movement
 Stewart Greenleaf (1939-2021), American politician
 Simon Greenleaf (1783–1853), American jurist
 William Greenleaf (born 1948), American science fiction author

People with the first name Greenleaf
 Greenleaf Clark (1835-1904), American jurist and lawyer
 Greenleaf Whittier Pickard (1877–1956), American radio pioneer
 Greenleaf S. Van Gorder (1855–1933), New York politician

People with the middle name Greenleaf
 Ezra Greenleaf Weld (1801–1874), American photographer, often known simply as "Greenleaf"
 John Greenleaf Whittier (1807–1892), American Quaker poet
 John Greenleaf Adams (1810–1897), American hymnwriter
 William Greenleaf Eliot (1811–1887), American educator